is the first game in the Cho Aniki series. It was originally released in 1992 on the Super CD-ROM² System. Years later, the game was released as part of Project EGG for Windows Store and Wii's Virtual Console in Japan, North America, and Europe. This makes it the first time any game of this series has seen release outside Japan.

Plot
The game's plot involves the heroes moving through various locations — space, urban environments, elaborate ruins — and fighting alien invaders. Bo Emperor Bill (Botei-biru, a pun on bodibil, a shortened form of bodybuild in Japanese), the man who achieved ten consecutive victories in the Great Galaxy Bodybuilding contest, faces an ever-decreasing supply of protein. He unilaterally invades neighboring star systems, in order to establish protein factories to replenish his supply. Feeling threatened, the heaven realm sent Idaten and Benten to vanquish Bo Emperor Bill. Thus the sweaty hot battle between the muscle brothers (aniki) and Builders Army begins.

Gameplay

Upon beginning a game or continuing, the player chooses between two playable characters: Idaten, a young man wearing a cape, and Benten, a blue-haired woman.

The player can pick up one of three support options by collecting randomly appearing power-ups. The most common is Samson/Adon, musclebound men clad in Speedos. The two hover about the hero, firing shots from the holes in their bald heads. The pair eventually became the series' mascots. The other options are Angel and Uminin.

The player character's firepower is increased by collecting proteins. They also have a stock of bombs which can be replenished with bomb pickups. Each player character has ten build levels, while each option has five build levels.

Reception
Lucas M. Thomas of IGN rated the Wii Virtual Console game 7.5 (good) for being the weirdest and most nonsensical Import to come to the American Virtual Console so far. Scott Sharkey of 1up.com listed the PC Engine game's sequel as having one of the worst game box covers of all time.

Soundtrack
Cho Aniki Aniki no subete is a soundtrack based on the video game. It was released by NEC Avenue in 1993-03-21, then by Columbia Music Entertainment in 1998-05-21.

References

External links
Hudson Soft page 
soundtrack review

1992 video games
Hudson Soft games
Masaya Games games
Horizontally scrolling shooters
Single-player video games
TurboGrafx-CD games
Video games developed in Japan
Virtual Console games
Windows games
PlayStation Network games